Chamaesphecia anthraciformis is a moth of the family Sesiidae. It is found in Italy and on Sicily, Corsica and Sardinia. It is also found in Morocco, Algeria, Tunisia and the Levant.

The larvae feed on Euphorbia nicaeensis, Euphorbia atlantica, Euphorbia myrsinites, Euphorbia ceratocarpa and Euphorbia characia.

References

Moths described in 1832
Sesiidae
Moths of Europe
Moths of Africa